Aimé Dossche (28 March 1902 - 30 October 1985) was a Belgian racing cyclist who won two stages in the 1926 Tour de France and one stage in the 1929 Tour de France, and as a result wore the yellow jersey for three days., although some sources indicate that two of those days he joined the lead with Aime Déolet, Marcel Bidot and Maurice Dewaele. Dossche was born in Landegem and died in Ghent.

Major results

1925
Kampioenschap van Vlaanderen
1926
Tour de France:
Winner stages 2 and 17
1927
Mere
1928
Circuit de Champagne
Erembodegem-Terjoden
Kampioenschap van Vlaanderen
1929
Landegem
Tour de France:
Winner stage 1
Wearing yellow jersey for three days
1930
Oudenaarde
Zelzate
1931
Ghent
Kampioenschap van Vlaanderen

References

External links

Belgian male cyclists
Belgian Tour de France stage winners
Cyclists from East Flanders
1902 births
1985 deaths
People from Nevele